One Day International (ODI) cricket is played between international cricket teams affiliated to the International Cricket Council (ICC), the global governing body of cricket. Men's ODI cricket is played between teams which are Full members of the ICC and the top four Associate and Affiliate members who achieve ODI status temporarily. Since 2018, matches played by Associate and Affiliate members as part of the Asia Cup or the ICC World Cup are also considered as ODIs. In women's cricket matches played between the top 10 ranked teams – as announced by ICC – are given ODI status, as are matches played as a part of the ICC Women's World Cup or ICC Women's Championship. ODIs consist of one innings per team, with a limit to the number of overs. This limit is currently 50 overs, although in the past it has been 55 or 60 overs.

The earliest match now recognized as an ODI was played between England and Australia at Melbourne Cricket Ground in January 1971; since then there have been over 4,000 ODIs. In the first ever ODI match John Edrich of England scored the first ever half century. He scored 82 runs which remained the highest individual score for that match. Dennis Amiss of England scored the first ever century in the second ever ODI in the following year. He scored 103 runs against Australia at Old Trafford Cricket Ground on 24 August 1972. The record of highest individual score progressed with Roy Fredericks's 105 and David Lloyd's unbeaten 116. In June 1975, Glenn Turner of New Zealand scored the first ever 150 plus score. He scored an 171 runs against East Africa at Edgbaston Cricket Ground, Birmingham on 7 June 1975. The record was bettered by Kapil Dev of India with an unbeaten 175 runs against Zimbabwe in the 1983 World Cup. In 1984, Viv Richards of the West Indies further bettered the record with an unbeaten 189 runs against England at Old Trafford.

Until December 1997, no player had achieved a score of 200 in ODIs. The highest individual score up to that point was 194 by Saeed Anwar of Pakistan, scored on 21 May 1997 against India at the M. A. Chidambaram Stadium, Chennai. On 16 December of the same year, the Australian woman cricketer Belinda Clark broke the 200-run mark. She set the highest individual score; an unbeaten 229 runs against Denmark at the MIG Club Ground, Mumbai. This record remained for almost 17 years until Rohit Sharma of India broke it on 13 November 2014. He scored an unbeaten 264 runs against Sri Lanka at Eden Gardens in Kolkata; this remains the highest individual score, . Clark's score remains the highest achieved by a captain, as well as the highest individual score in the Women's World Cup.

In men's cricket, Zimbabwe's Charles Coventry equalled Anwar's record after 12 years. He scored 194 not out against Bangladesh at Queens Sports Club in Bulawayo, on 16 August 2009. In men's cricket, the first player to score a double century was India's Sachin Tendulkar. He scored 200 not out against South Africa at Captain Roop Singh Stadium, Gwalior, on 24 February 2010. After this in 2011 Virender Sehwag scored highest 219 runs against west indies. At that time Sehwag became the second player to score a double century in Men's One Day Internationals. In women's cricket Amelia Kerr of New Zealand set a new highest individual score in women's ODI when she broke Belinda Clark's 21-year-old record on 13 June 2018, scoring an unbeaten 232 runs against Ireland. Kerr is also the youngest player to score a double century, achieving the feat at the age of 17. New Zealand's Martin Guptill is the highest individual scorer in any ICC tournament with an unbeaten 237 runs against the West Indies at Westpac Stadium, Wellington. in the 2015 Cricket World Cup. Rohit Sharma is the only player with three ODI double centuries having scored 209, 264 and 208*. On 10 December 2022, Ishan Kishan became the fourth Indian batsman to score a double century. He scored 210 runs against Bangladesh in the third ODI in the India vs Bangladesh ODI Series and scored the fasted double century in ODI cricket, scoring 200 off of 126 balls. On 18 January 2023, Shubman Gill became the second youngest player to score a double century. He was 23 years and 123 days old. His score of 208 runs against New Zealand in the first ODI of the 2023 India vs New Zealand ODI Series made him the fifth Indian and eighth overall to score a double century.

Keys

Highest one day individual scorers

Men

Women

Progression to highest individual score

See also 

List of Cricket World Cup centuries
List of One Day International cricket records
List of women's One Day International cricket records
Lists of cricket records

References

External links 
Most Runs in an Innings in Men's ODI by ESPN Cricinfo
Most Runs in an Innings in Women's ODI by ESPN Cricinfo
Top 5 IPL records held by Chris Gayle in IPL History by India Sports

One Day International cricket records
Cricket-related lists